Haimar Wedemeyer (22 September 1906 – 13 November 1998) was a German sailor. He competed in the mixed 6 metres at the 1936 Summer Olympics.

Personal life
Wedemeyer served as a kapitänleutnant in the Kriegsmarine during the Second World War. He commanded  between 1943–44, sinking three ships in five patrols.

References

1906 births
1998 deaths
Olympic sailors of Germany
Sailors at the 1936 Summer Olympics – 6 Metre
U-boat commanders (Kriegsmarine)
Sportspeople from Marburg
German male sailors (sport)
Recipients of the Iron Cross (1939), 1st class
Recipients of the Iron Cross (1939), 2nd class
Recipients of the Gold German Cross
Military personnel from Hesse